Gigantohyrax was a genus of herbivorous hyrax-grouped mammals from the Pliocene Shungura Formation of Ethiopia. Fossils have also been found in Makapansgat of South Africa.

Description

Gigantohyrax maguirei is a type and only species. Holotype BPI M8230 is two thirds of an anterior part of the skull with complete upper dentition. The second and third incisors are lost, making it more similar to latest hyraxes than the earlier species. Despite its name, Gigantohyrax didn't reach such gigantic sizes as Megalohyrax and Titanohyrax from the Early Tertiary, although it was three times as large as the extanct Procavia capensis from the same family.

It has many features in common with the extinct Dendrohyrax, although Gigantohyrax has less difference between the parameters of the
molars and premolars.

See also
 Largest prehistoric animals

References

†
Pliocene mammals of Africa
Fossils of Ethiopia
Fossil taxa described in 1965
Prehistoric placental genera
Prehistoric monotypic mammal genera